Etelä-Haaga (Finnish), Södra Haga (Swedish) is a neighborhood of Helsinki, Finland.

Haaga